Edinburgh Academicals is a cricket club based in Edinburgh, that currently competes in the Scotland Championship. The club was formed in 1855 by alumni of the Edinburgh Academy and play at Raeburn Place. The club is the oldest Old Boys cricket club in Scotland. Originally only open to former pupils of the Edinburgh Academy, the club is now fully open to everyone.

Key

References
 Edinburgh Academical CC 1854 - 2004 (2005). Ian D. Stevenson, 52 pages
 One Hundred Years at Raeburn Place 1854 - 1954 (1954). Published by the Edinburgh Academicals Club

External links
 Edinburgh Academicals Cricket Club Official Site

Scottish cricket lists
Seasons in Scottish cricket